Tenmyouya Hisashi (天明屋尚, born 1966 in Tokyo, Japan) is a Japanese contemporary artist.

Tenmyouya's unique style, he calls Neo-Nihonga, revives Japanese traditional painting as a contemporary art. In 2000 he also created the new-style "Butouha" which resists the authoritative art system through his painting.

In 2010 he proposed a new Japanese art scheme named "Basara" which is extravagant and extraordinary and embodies a Samurai aesthetic like "Basara" in the Nanboku dynasty era and Kabuki-mono at the end of the Sengoku era.

Neo Nihonga (Neo Japanese-style painting) 
"Neo Japanese-style painting" is an art concept, founded by Tenmyouya Hisashi in 2001. It is the antithesis of a modern Japanese-style painting. He thinks a modern Japanese-style painting whose role as an opposite concept of a modern Western-style painting ended keeps to traditional painting materials such as mineral pigments, glue and ink.  On the other hand, Neo Japanese-style painting uses modern media like acrylic paint while referring to some features of Japanese art such as a traditional line as well as its decorative, symbolic and playful ones. As for subjects, it quotes traditional Japanese essence to make real Japanese contemporary art.

Neo Japanese-style painting is a suggestion, inspecting the concept of "modern Japanese-style painting" which was made and twisted artificially in the Meiji era. It offers yet another possibility for a Japanese contemporary art history.

Moreover, in Neo Japanese-style painting, classic Japanese paintings and styles before the Meiji age are respected and modernized. In short, Neo Japanese-style painting takes the spirit of Ukiyo-e and  other Japanese classic painting and develops them further.

Basara 
"Basara" is an art concept which Tenmyouya developed in 2010. The term "Basara" refers to the family of beauty that with innovative unprecedented beauty, includes the basara of the Nanbokucho Period, the kabukimono of the end of the Warring States Period, the ukiy-o-eshi of the end of the Edo period and Japanese recent youth culture with bad and decorative (kitsch) tastes. He regards the culture as standing on the opposite end of the spectrum from wabi sabi and is incompatible with Otaku culture. Also with this aspect he aims to connect Japanese culture and history more directly to make an original Japanese art story.

As for "Basara", he deliberately avoids being too introvert since he thinks of it as a weakness of Japanese art and often quotes Japanese historical elements. Indeed, Basara covers a wide range, referencing ancient culture, samurai culture and contemporary Japanese youth culture. Especially, Basara focuses on today's street culture as well as samurai culture at the end of the Warring States Period or the end of the Edo period which has been considered low culture for a long time.

Influences
Avant-garde artist, theorist and intellectual Tarō Okamoto (b.1911) once separated Japanese art into the two categories of "Yayoi-like" art characterized by grace and delicate features, and "Jomon-like" art characterized by dynamic and innovative features. The term "Basara" is an adopted and developed version of Taro's concept of "Jomon-like" art, which is excessive in beauty yet innovative. Implicitly Tenmyouya's art criticizes a conservative attitude which just receives an established value blindly and avoids taking a risk for new, unique things.

Publishing
Tenmyouya published an art book BASARA Japanese art theory crossing borders: from Jomon pottery to decorated trucks, which has more details along with lavish photos and both Japanese and English texts.

Personal life
He currently lives and works in Saitama, Japan and is represented by the Mizuma Art Gallery in Tokyo.

Selected solo exhibitions 
 " Japanese Spirit " at Harajuku Gallery, Tokyo, Japan, 2000
 " Tenmyouya Hisashi Exhibition " at PROGETTO (Tokyo, Japan), 2001
 " NEO Japanese Paintings " at Depot (Tokyo, Japan), 2002
 " Gakyo " at Nadiff (Tokyo, Japan), 2003
 " Tenmyouya Hisashi " at the reed spase.(New York, U.S.A), 2003
 " Kabuku " at Mizuma Art Gallery (Tokyo, Japan), 2003
 " Deceptive Spirits of the Mountains and Rivers "　at Mizuma Art Gallery (Tokyo, Japan), 2004
 " Bunshin " at Mizuma Art Gallery (Tokyo, Japan), 2005
 " MADE IN JAPAN " at Mizuma Art Gallery (Tokyo, Japan), 2006
 " NEO Japanese Paintings " at Roppongi hills art design store space A+D (Tokyo, Japan), 2007
 " Fighting Spirit " at Mizuma Art Gallery (Tokyo, Japan), 2008
 " FURYU - EXTRAVAGANT " at Mizuma Art Gallery (Tokyo, Japan), 2009
 " G-tokyo 2011" Mori arts center gallery (Tokyo, Japan), 2011
 " Rhyme " at Mizuma Art Gallery (Tokyo, Japan), 2012
 " Rough Sketch and Print " at TENGAI GALLERY (Tokyo, Japan), 2013
 " Process through to the original - Sketch" Roppongi Hills A/D Gallery(Tokyo, Japan),2014
 " Rhyme II " Mizuma Art Gallery (Tokyo, Japan),2014
 " Ippitsu-Nyuukon Exhibition" Parco Museum (Tokyo, Japan),2014

Selected group exhibitions 
 " One Planet under a Groove : Hip Hop and Contemporary Art " Bronx Museum (New York, U.S.A), Walker Art Center (Minneapolis, U.S.A), traveled to Spellman College Art Museum (Atlanta, U.S.A), Museum Villa Stuck (Munich, Germany), 2001
 " Kyosai plus one, Kawanabe Kyosai and Tenmyouya Hisashi " Kawanabe Kyosai Memorial Museum (Saitama, Japan),2002
 " 6th Exhibition of the Taro Okamoto Memorial Award for Contemporary Art " Taro Okamoto Museum of Art, Kawasaki (Kanagawa, Japan), 2003
 " The American Effect - Global Perspective on the United States, 1990-2003 " Whitney Museum of American Art (New York, U.S.A), 2003
 " Japan : Rising " Palm Beach Institute of Contemporary Art (Florida, U.S.A), 2003
 " Astonishment house house exhibit space" PARCO Museum(Tokyo, Japan), 2004
 " Asian Invitationa " Frey Norris Gallely (San Francisco,U.S.A), 2004
 " GUNDAM, Generating Futures " Suntory Museum (Osaka, Japan), traveled to The Ueno Royal Museum (Tokyo, Japan), Sendai Mediatheque (Miyagi, Japan), traveled to Kawara Museum (Aichi, Japan), Museum of Contemporary Art, Sapporo (Hokkaido, Japan),Generating Futures " Kyoto International Manga Museum (Kyoto, Japan), 2005
 " MOT Annual, " Museum of Contemporary Art, Tokyo (Tokyo, Japan), 2006
 " Berlin - Tokyo " Neue Nationalgalerie (Berlin, Germany), 2006
 " HEROES IN WARRIOR PAINTINGS " Nagano Prefectural Shinano Art Museum (Nagano, Japan), 2007
 " neoteny Japan " Kirishima Open-Air Museum(Kagoshima,Japan), Museum of Contemporary Art, Sapporo (Hokkaido, Japan),Museum of Contemporary Art, Sapporo (Hokkaido, Japan),The Ueno Royal Museum (Tokyo, Japan),The Niigata Prefectural Museum of Modern Art(Niigata, Japan), Akita Museum of Modern Art(Akita,Japan),Yonago City Museum of Art (Totutoriken, Japan), The Museum of Art, Ehime (Ehime, Japan), 2008
 " Go Game, Beijing! " German embassy(China,Beijing), 2008
 " Vision of East Asian 2008 " national library exhibition room in China(China,Beijing), Fine Art Hall of Henan Art Centre(China,Zhengzhou), 2008
 " AIDA Makoto＋TENMYOUYA Hisashi＋YAMAGUCHI Akira" Takahashi Collection Hibiya (Tokyo, Japan), 2010
 " 17th Biennale of Sydney " (Sydney,Australia), 2010
 " BASARA " Spiral Garden(Tokyo, Japan), 2010
 " TDW-ART JALAPAGOSU Exhibition " Meiji Jingu Gaien(Tokyo, Japan), 2010
 " SugiPOP! " Portsmouth Museum of Art(New Hampshire, U.S.A), 2010
 " Bye Bye Kitty!!! Between Heaven and Hell in Contemporary Japanese Art" japansociety(New York, U.S.A), 2011
 " Request top 30 — Step of the past 10 years " Takahashi Collection TABLOID GALLERY(Tokyo, Japan), 2011
 " ZIPANG " Nihonbashi Takashimaya(Tokyo, Japan),Osaka Takashimaya(Osaka, Japan),KyotoTakashimaya(Kyoto, Japan),The Nigata Bandaijima Art Museum (Nigata, Japan),Talasaki Museum of Art (gunma, Japan), 2011
 " Taguchi Art Collection GLOBAL NEW ART " Sompo Japan Museum of Art(Tokyo, Japan), 2011
 " JALAPAGOSU Exhibition " Mitsubishi-Jisho Artium(Fukuoka, Japan), 2011
 " TDW-ART ITO JAKUCHU INSPIRED " Meiji Jingu Gaien(Tokyo, Japan), 2012
 " Wonderful my art - Artists of the Takahashi collection " KAWAGUCHIKO MUSEUM OF ART(Yamanashi, Japan), 2013
 " Ikeda Manabu and Tenmyouya Hisashi " Chazen Museum of Art(Madison, U.S.A), 2013
 " Soccer exhibition - Whereabouts of the image" Urawa Art Museum(Saitama, Japan),2014
 " Taguchi Art Collection TAG-TEN" Matsumoto City Museum of Art(Nagano, Japan),2014
 " Garden of Unearthly Delights: Works by Ikeda, Tenmyouya & teamlab" Japan Society (New York, USA),2014
 " Winners of the Taro Okamoto Award for Contemporary Art" Taro Okamoto　Museume of Art (Ｋanagawa, Ｊapan),2014

Awards 
 11th Japan Graphic Exhibition, Winning judge Prize, 1990
 JACA'97, Winning special prize, 1997
 URBANART#8, Winning Lichtex Prize, 1999
 8th Lichtex Biennale, Winning encouragement Prize, 2001
 6th Exhibition of the Taro Okamoto Memorial Award for Contemporary Art "Winning excellent prize, 2003
 The only Japanese artist selected for the FIFA World Cup Germany Poster, 2006

Public collections 
 The Museum of Fine Arts（Houston, U.S.A）MFAH
 Chazen Museum of Art（Madison, U.S.A）
 Takamatsu city museum of Art  (Takamatsu, Japan)
 Takahashi Collection（Tokyo, Japan）
 Taguchi Collection（Tokyo, Japan）

Books 
 Tenmyouya Hisashi art catalog "Japanese Spirit" (Published by Gakken Co., Ltd.), 2003
 Tenmyouya Hisashi art catalog "Kabuki-mono" (Published by PARCO Co., Ltd.), 2004
 Tenmyouya Hisashi art catalog "Tenmyouya Hisashi" (Published by Kawade Shobo Shinsha, Publishers), 2006
 Tenmyouya Hisashi art catalog "KAMON TENMYOUYA HISASHI" (Published by KING OF MOUNTAIN), 2007
 Written by Tenmyouya Hisashi "BASARA Japanese art theory crossing borders : from Jomon pottery to decorated trucks"(Published by Bijutsu Shuppan-sha, Co., LTD), 2010
 Tenmyouya Hisashi art catalog "Masterpiece" (Published by Seigenshiya, Publishers), 2014

References

External links 
Homepage of Tenmyouya Hisashi
Mizuma art gallery artist page／Hisashi Tenmyouya

1966 births
Japanese contemporary artists
Living people
People from Tokyo
Street artists